Carl Axel Eberhart Rosenblad (25 August 1886 – 24 January 1953) was a Swedish horse rider who competed in the 1912 Summer Olympics. He finished fifth in the Individual dressage competition with his horse Miss Hastings.

References

1886 births
1953 deaths
Swedish dressage riders
Olympic equestrians of Sweden
Swedish male equestrians
Equestrians at the 1912 Summer Olympics